Statenville is an unincorporated community in and the county seat of Echols County, Georgia, United States. It is a census-designated place (CDP), with a population of 1,040 at the 2010 census. The ZIP code is 31648, and the area code 229.

History
The town of Statenville was originally called Troublesome. It grew up at a ford on the Alapaha River in the 1850s. Troublesome was renamed Statenville when the latter was designated county seat in 1858 of the newly-formed Echols County. It is named for James Watson Staten, but was erroneously incorporated as "Statesville" in 1859. In 1965, the state officially amended the city's charter to read "Statenville". In 1995, a new state law revoked the city charter, along with dozens of others in Georgia which had inactive governments. This left Echols and Webster as the only counties in Georgia with no incorporated communities whatsoever.

Columbia County has the unincorporated county seat of Appling, though most court functions take place in Evans.

Knoxville is the unincorporated county seat of Crawford County, with the city of Roberta just to its west that grew with the railroad.

Geography
Statenville is located in western Echols County, just east of the Alapaha River. U.S. Route 129 passes through the community, leading north  to Lakeland, south  to the Florida border, and south  to Jasper, Florida. Georgia State Route 94 crosses US 129 in the center of Statenville, leading east  to Fargo and northwest  to Valdosta.

Education 
The Echols County School District consists of two schools. The district has 40 full-time teachers and over 700 students.

The South Georgia Regional Library operates the Hansford Allen Echols County Library. Named after timber and turpentine farmer Handsford Allen, who contributed money towards the establishment of the library, it is the smallest library in the system. It opened on July 19, 1992, with its construction funded by State of Georgia money. The community previously had its library in other locations: first in a Methodist church and later in the school district superintendent's courthouse office.

References

External links 

 Echols County, Georgia, including the communities of Statenville, Howell, Mayday, Fruitland, Needmore, Potter, Tarver, and Haylow

Unincorporated communities in Georgia (U.S. state)
Unincorporated communities in Echols County, Georgia
County seats in Georgia (U.S. state)
Census-designated places in the Valdosta metropolitan area